This is a list of bays of the British Isles, geographically by island.   They are listed by island, in clockwise order, from the stated starting point.

Britain
Clockwise from the River Tweed:

England from the River Tweed to the Bristol Channel

Wales

Cardiff Bay
Swansea Bay
Rhossili Bay
Carmarthen Bay
St Bride's Bay
Fishguard Bay
Newport Bay
Cardigan Bay
Tremadog Bay
Caernarfon Bay
Holyhead Bay
Conwy Bay

England from the River Dee to the Solway Firth
Liverpool Bay
Morecambe Bay
Duddon Estuary
Moricambe Bay

Scotland

Solway Firth to Oban

Oban to Cape Wrath

Cape Wrath to Moray Firth
Dunnet Bay
Sinclairs Bay

Moray Firth to Rattray Head

Rattray Head to River Tweed

Hebrides

Islay
Laggan Bay

Mull
Carsaig Bay
Calgary Bay

Lewis
Broad Bay

Orkney Mainland
Scapa Bay
Bay of Firth
Bay of Kirkwall
Inganess Bay

Isle of Man

Clockwise from the Point of Ayre
Ramsey Bay, Ramsey
Bulgham Bay
Laxey Bay, Laxey
Garwick Bay
Douglas Bay, Douglas
Derby Haven, Derbyhaven
Castletown Bay, Castletown
Bay ny Carrickey, Port St Mary
Port St Mary Bay
Perwick Bay
Bay Stacka
Port Erin Bay, Port Erin
Fleshwick Bay, Port Erin
Niarbyl Bay, Patrick
Peel Bay, Peel

Isle of Wight

Clockwise from Cowes 
Osborne Bay
Seagrove Bay, Seaview
Priory Bay
Whitecliff Bay
Horseshoe Bay, near Culver Down
Sandown Bay, Sandown, Shanklin
Luccombe Bay
Steel Bay
Monks Bay, Bonchurch
Horseshoe Bay, Bonchurch
Wheelers Bay
Ventnor Bay, Ventnor
Woody Bay
Binnel Bay
Reeth Bay
Watershoot Bay
Chale Bay, Blackgang Chine
Brighstone Bay
Brook Bay, Brook
Compton Bay
Freshwater Bay, Freshwater
Watcombe Bay
Scratchell's Bay
Alum Bay
Totland Bay, Totland
Colwell Bay
Newtown Bay
Thorness Bay
Gurnard Bay

Ireland
Anti-clockwise from Lough Foyle:

Northern Ireland
Dundrum Bay
Red Bay
Ballycastle Bay

See also
Firths of Scotland
Lochs of Scotland

 
 
Bays of the British Isles
Bays of the British Isles
Bays
Brit Isles